Neal Bradley Long (September 19, 1927 – June 12, 1998), known as The Shotgun Slayer, was an American serial killer responsible for at least 21 attacks perpetrated against African-American men in Dayton, Ohio between 1972 and September 1975, as a result of which between four and seven people died and 14 others received injuries of varying severity. Following his capture, Long fully admitted his guilt and was convicted of the murders, receiving several life imprisonment terms as punishment. He died in a federal medical center in Minnesota in 1998.

Biography 
Very little is known about Long's upbringing. It is known that he was born on September 19, 1927 in Campton, Kentucky, but moved to Dayton in 1944, where he would spend most of his life prior to his arrest. In the late 1940s, he married and later on had seven children, but problems began to arise in the mid-1960s, when Neal began showing signs of a mental illness, as well as violent behavior directed at Black people. On October 31, 1966, he went to the police station and claimed that in the summer of 1944, when he was 17, he and a friend had been attacked by two Black men on Washington Street. Long claimed that he had stabbed the man in self-defense and then fled the scene, leaving the man bleeding on the ground. After this, he was temporarily detained but later released, as authorities were unable to find any record of such an incident occurring at the time and location Long had indicated. Due to his deteriorating mental health, Long sought help from a psychiatrist in 1968, and then voluntarily agreed to undergo treatment at the Dayton Mental Health Center, where he spent three months. While interned there, he was diagnosed with a psychopathic personality disorder. Long also held a lifelong interest in firearms and military paraphernalia, owning several pistols and shotguns in his private collection. At the time of his arrest, he was going through divorce procedures and worked at a service station in Kettering.

In 2016, the Dayton Daily News published an article wherein a former Dayton police officer claimed Long to have been the person who killed Lester Mitchell, an African American man, in 1966. Mitchell's death was the immediate cause of the 1966 Dayton race riot, and his murderer has never been found.

Murder of Charles Glatt and exposure 
On the afternoon of September 19, 1975, Long entered the Federal Office building and asked for 46-year-old sociologist Dr. Charles A. Glatt. When Glatt replied, he was gunned down with four pistol shots to the neck, chest and abdomen. A few minutes later, Long was arrested by guards, and Glatt was sent to the hospital to be treated for his injuries, but died due to complications three hours after the shooting. Glatt worked at Ohio State University and was considered one of the leading experts in the design and implementation of desegregation busing programs in major American cities. By 1975, he had developed plans to end segregation in public schools in 18 states, and early that year, he had been appointed by the 6th Circuit Court of Appeals to develop a similar program for the Dayton school system, which was to be completed by November 3. Long later stated that his motive for killing Glatt was his segregation programs, which would pit together Black students with the majority White students, and vice versa, which would supposedly result in conflict, higher crime rate, and his 12-year-old son, Mark, being physically assaulted by African-American children.

After his arrest, Long admitted that during the period of 1972 and 1975, while under the influence of alcohol and drugs, he had committed between 25 and 30 attacks against Black people in Dayton, shooting them using a double-barrel shotgun from his Ford Fairlane. Several people were killed as a result, with the murders causing a moral panic, and the perpetrator being dubbed 'The Shotgun Slayer' or 'The Midnight Slayer'. As a result, a reward of $10,000 was offered for information leading to the capture of the elusive killer, with townspeople patrolling the streets at night and various civil rights groups asking the city to declare a state of emergency. Dayton police were unable to solve the case, and in their desperation, they asked the FBI for assistance, but their request was turned down. Initially, Long's testimony was doubted, but in the following weeks, he was identified as the shooter by several survivors and witnesses. When his apartment was searched, police found several shotguns and pistols covered by pillow cases.

Following this, after comparing Long's testimony with the dates, geographic data and times of year when he allegedly committed the murders, the investigators charged with several attacks and six murders (separate from the Glatt killing). Long was charged with shooting Eddie Freson on August 21, 1972, who was wounded, but survived; the September 26, 1973 murder of Edward Tillman and wounding of James Watts; the May 23, 1975 shooting at a crowd of African-American gathered at a party, resulting in gunshot wounds to the arm of George Ingram; the July 1975 murders of 27-year-old Larry Romine in Dayton View and 21-year-old Robert Hoard on Cincinnati Street; and finally, the attempted murders of Leonard Goff and Glenda Gay, which occurred a few days after the Romine-Hoard shootings. According to Long himself, his motivation was his hatred towards Black people.

Trial 
In late September, at one of the pre-trial hearings, Long's lawyers filed a motion for a forensic psychiatric evaluation to establish whether their client was sane, which was granted. The results, released on November 4, established that Neal Long was sane and subject to criminal liability.

The trial began in late 1976, beginning with the murder of Charles Glatt. At trial, Long fully admitted his guilt and expressed remorse for his crimes. In November 1976, he pleaded guilty in federal court to civil rights charges and first degree murder in relation to the killing of Glatt, and on December 27, was sentenced to two consecutive life terms. In 1977, Long pleaded guilty to three counts of murder in state court and received three additional life terms.

Death 
Due to the high-profile nature of his crimes and for his own safety, Long spent the remainder of his life in various federal institutions outside Ohio under an assumed name. In the mid-1990s, he was transferred to the Federal Medical Center in Rochester, Minnesota, where he died on June 12, 1998.

See also
 List of serial killers in the United States
 Christopher Peterson, African American serial killer known as "The Shotgun Killer" who claimed to be motivated by hatred of White people

References

External links
 FindAGrave.com

1927 births
1998 deaths
20th-century American criminals
American male criminals
American people convicted of attempted murder
American people convicted of murder
American serial killers
Criminals from Kentucky
History of Dayton, Ohio
Male serial killers
People convicted of murder by Ohio
People from Wolfe County, Kentucky
People with antisocial personality disorder
Prisoners sentenced to life imprisonment by Ohio
Racially motivated violence against African Americans
Prisoners who died in United States federal government detention
American people who died in prison custody
Serial killers who died in prison custody
Violence against men in North America